Awards and decorations of the state defense forces are presented to members of the state defense forces in addition to regular United States military decorations and state National Guard military decorations.  Each of the state governments of the United States maintains a series of decorations for issuance to members of the state defense forces, with such awards presented under the authority of the various state adjutants general and/or respective state defense force commanders.

In most states, state defense force members may wear any regular United States military decorations and United States National Guard decorations that they may have earned while members of the National Guard and/or while in federal active duty service.  The members of some state defense force may also be awarded state National Guard military decorations in addition to state defense force awards while serving in a state defense force capacity.  The order of precedence for the wear of the awards are: federal, state National Guard, then state defense force.

Those state defense force members who subsequently serve in the active or reserve federal forces of the United States Army, Navy, Marine Corps, Coast Guard, or United States Air Force (i.e., on active duty or as members of the Army, Navy, Air Force, Marine Corps, or Coast Guard Reserves) may not continue to wear and display such decorations on a military uniform.  Regulations of these federal forces allow their members to accept but not wear state National Guard awards.

The following is a list of state defense force decorations, as issued by each of the states and territories of the United States.

Alabama

Alabama State Defense Force (ASDF) Awards:

  ASDF Alabama War Ribbon
  ASDF Distinguished Service Ribbon
  ASDF Meritorious Service Ribbon
  ASDF Commendation Ribbon
  ASDF Achievement Ribbon (Officer)
  ASDF Achievement Ribbon (Enlisted)
  ASDF Merit Ribbon
  ASDF Desert Shield/Storm Support Ribbon
  ASDF Disaster Readiness Ribbon
  SGT Dixie Club-Gold Ribbon
  SGT Dixie Club-Silver Ribbon
  SGT Dixie Club-Bronze Ribbon
  ASDF Service Ribbon
  ASDF Distinguished Graduate Ribbon
  ASDF Professional Development Ribbon
  ASDF Officer Training Ribbon
  ASDF Warrant Officer Training Ribbon
  ASDF NCO Training Ribbon
  ASDF C.E.R.T. Ribbon
  ASDF Recruiting Ribbon
  ASDF Super Recruiter Recruiting Ribbon
  ASDF Association Member Ribbon
  State Guard Association of the US (SGAUS) Membership Ribbon
  ASDF Outstanding Unit Comm. Ribbon
  SGAUS Superior Unit Citation
  MEMS Academy Unit Citation (obsolete; no longer used)

Alaska

Alaska State Defense Force (ASDF) Awards and Decorations
   Alaska Decoration of Honor 
  Alaska Heroism Medal 
  Alaska Distinguished Service Medal
   Alaska Legion of Merit 
  Alaska Meritorious Service Medal 
   Alaska Air Medal
  Alaska Commendation Medal
  Alaska Achievement Medal 
   Alaska Humanitarian Service Medal 
   Alaska State Service Medal 
   Alaska Community Service Medal 
   Alaska Domestic Emergency Ribbon 
   Alaska Marksmanship Medal 
  Alaska Homeland Security Medal
  Alaska Recruiting Ribbon
   Alaska State Partnership Program Ribbon   
   Alaska Cold War Victory Ribbon   
  Alaska Territorial Guard Medal 
   Alaska State Defense Force Commendation Medal
   Alaska State Defense Force Achievement Medal 
   Alaska State Defense Force State Activation Medal  
   Alaska State Defense Force Service Medal 
   Alaska State Defense Force Training Achievement Ribbon  
   Alaska State Defense Force Good Conduct (formerly Drill Attendance) Ribbon 
   State Guard Association of the United States (SGAUS) Longevity Ribbon
  State Guard Association of the United States (SGAUS) Professional Development Ribbon 
   State Guard Association of the United States (SGAUS) Membership Ribbon
  ALASKA UNIT CITATIONS: 
  Alaska Governor's Distinguished Unit Citation
  SGAUS Meritorious Unit Citation (awarded 2014)
  SGAUS Superior Unit Citation (awarded 1998)

California

California State Guard (formerly State Military Reserve) (CASG) Awards:

  CA SMR Military History Medal
  CA SMR Training Excellence Ribbon
  CA SMR Enlisted Excellence Ribbon
  CA SMR Recruiting Achievement Ribbon
  CA SMR Professional Development Ribbon
  CA SMR Mission Qualification Ribbon
  CA SMR Emergency Training Ribbon
  CA SMR Outstanding Services Ribbon
  CA SMR Volunteer Service Ribbon
  CA SMR Drill Attendance Ribbon
  CA SMR Governor's Outstanding Unit Citation

Georgia

Georgia State Defense Force (GaSDF) Awards & Decorations:

  GaSDF Medal of Valor
  GaSDF Legion of Merit (Medal)
  GaSDF Medal of Merit
  GaSDF Distinguished Service Medal
  GaSDF Commendation Medal
  GaSDF Enlisted Member of the Year
  GaSDF Achievement Ribbon (Class 1, 2 & 3)
  GaSDF Military Qualification Training Ribbon
  GaSDF Military Proficiency Ribbon
  GaSDF State Active Duty Ribbon
  GaSDF Emergency Services School Ribbon
  GaSDF Military Readiness Ribbon
  GaSDF Recruiting Achievement Ribbon
  GaSDF Volunteer Service Ribbon
  GaSDF Good Conduct Ribbon
  GaSDF Longevity Service Ribbon
  GaSDF Military Indoctrination Ribbon
  GaSDF Unit Commander's Citation w/Gold Frame
  GaSDF Outstanding Unit Citation Ribbon W/Gold Frame

Indiana

Indiana Guard Reserve Awards:

  Indiana Distinguished Service Cross (National Guard & Guard Reserve)
  Indiana Distinguished Service Medal (National Guard & Guard Reserve)
  Indiana Commendation Medal (National Guard & Guard Reserve)
  Indiana Homeland Defense Ribbon
  Indiana Emergency Service Ribbon
  Indiana Funeral Honors Ribbon
  INGR Merit Medal
  INGR Distinguished Service Ribbon
  INGR Commendation Ribbon
  INGR Achievement Ribbon
  INGR JROTC Commendation Ribbon
  INGR Outstanding Recruiter Ribbon
  INGR JROTC Support Ribbon
  INGR Community Service Ribbon
  INGR Search and Rescue Ribbon
  INGR C.E.R.T. Ribbon
  INGR Emergency Management Specialist Ribbon
  INGR Officer Professional Development Ribbon
  INGR NCO Professional Development Ribbon
  INGR Physical Fitness Ribbon
  INGR 25 Year Service Ribbon
  INGR Long Service Ribbon
  INGR Service Ribbon
  INGR Defense Service Ribbon
  INGR The Indiana Guard Reserve Association Ribbon
  INGR Superior Unit Citation
  INGR Medallion

Maryland

Maryland State Defense Force (MDDF) Awards & Decorations:

  The State Of Maryland Distinguished Service Cross for Valor
  The State Of Maryland Distinguished Service Cross
  State of Maryland Meritorious Service Medal
  State Of Maryland Commendation Medal
  The Maryland Meritorious Civilian Service Medal
  Maryland National Guard Outstanding Unit Ribbon
  The Adjutant General's Special Recognition Ribbon
  Maryland Military Department Emergency Service Medal
  The Maryland National Guard Recruiting Medal
  The Maryland Military Department Overseas Service Ribbon
  State Of Maryland State Service Medal
  The Maryland Defense Force Meritorious Service Ribbon
  The Maryland Defense Force Commendation Ribbon
  The Maryland Defense Force Humanitarian Service Medal
  The Maryland Defense Force Honorable Service Ribbon (Withdrawn from the MDDF Awards Program effective 12 SEPT 2015)
  The Maryland Defense Force Achievement Ribbon
  The Maryland Defense Force Aid To Civil Authority Ribbon
  The Maryland Defense Force Community Service Ribbon
  The Maryland Defense Force Community Emergency Response Team Ribbon
  The Maryland Defense Force Professional Development Ribbon
  The Maryland Defense Force Initial Entry Training Ribbon
  The Maryland Defense Force Recruiting Ribbon
  The Maryland Defense Force Physical Fitness Ribbon
  The Maryland Defense Force Membership Ribbon
  Maryland State Guard Association MDDF Soldier of the Year Ribbon
  Maryland State Guard Association Militia Medal w/Bronze Star

Massachusetts
  Mass Defense Service Ribbon
  Mass Defense Expeditionary Medal

Mississippi

Mississippi State Guard (MSSG) Individual Awards:

 MSSG Distinguished Service Ribbon
 MSSG Meritorious Service Ribbon
 MSSG Commendation Ribbon
 MSSG Achievement Ribbon
 MSSG Award of Merit
 MSSG Longevity Service Ribbon
 MSSG Operation Desert Shield/Storm Service Ribbon
 MSSG Recruitment Ribbon
 MSSG Training Ribbon
 MSSG Association Membership Ribbon

Mississippi State Guard Unit Awards:

 MSSG Outstanding Unit Citation

New Mexico

New Mexico State Guard (NMSG) Awards:

  New Mexico State Guard Commendation Medal 
  New Mexico State Guard Achievement Medal 
  New Mexico State Guard Cold War Victory Medal 
  New Mexico State Guard Emergency Service Ribbon
  New Mexico State Guard Service Ribbon
  New Mexico State Guard Professional Development Ribbon 
  New Mexico State Guard Superior Unit Award
  New Mexico State Guard Unit Citation

New York

New York Guard (NYG) Awards:

  NYG Commander's Citation
  NYG Achievement Medal
  NYG Good Conduct Medal
  NYG Operations Support Medal
  NYG Service Ribbon
  NYG Distinguished Graduate Ribbon
  NYG First Provisional Regiment Medal

In addition, certain New York State decorations may be awarded to New York Guard members, as well as to members of other state military components, i.e., NY Army National Guard, NY Air National Guard and NY Naval Militia.  These include:

  NYS Medal of Valor
  NYS Conspicuous Service Medal
  NYS Meritorious Service Medal
  NYS Military Commendation Medal
  NYS Long and Faithful Service Medal
  NYS Defense of Liberty Medal
  Recruiting Medal
  New York Aid to Civil Authority Medal
  New York Counterdrug Service Ribbon
  Humane Service to NYS Medal
  NYS Physical Fitness Ribbon

Ohio

Ohio Military Reserve (OHMR) Awards:

  OHMR Medal of Valor - The first recipient of this medal was LTC Mitchell E. Fadem, HAZMAT Officer for the 5th MP BDE, OHMR, in 1993 when he risked his life to monitor toxic vapor clouds inside the blast area after a chemical plant exploded in Elyria, Ohio.  His efforts made it possible for the safe evacuation of 6,000 people. Fadem is now a lieutenant colonel in the US Air Force and served in Afghanistan in 2007 with the Combined Security Transition Command and in 2010 at the Headquarters of the International Security Assistance Forces in Kabul as a toxicologist and senior health care LNO with the Ministry of Public Health and Ministry of Mines. In December 2010, Fadem was awarded a Bronze Star Medal for heroism and meritorious service during his deployment to Afghanistan.
  OHMR  Distinguished Service Medal
  OHMR Medal of Merit
  OHMR Purple Cross Medal
  OHMR Lifesaving Medal
  OHMR Commendation Award
  OHMR Achievement Award
  OHMR Search and Rescue Award
  OHMR Community Service Award
  OHMR Aid to Civil Authority Award
  OHMR Good Conduct Award
  OHMR Longevity Service Award
  OHMR Soldier of the Year Award
  OHMR Honor Graduate Award
  OHMR Officer Training Graduate Award
  OHMR NCO Training Graduate Award
  OHMR Basic Entry Level Training Graduate Award
  OHMR Physical Fitness Award
  OHMR Federal Service School Award
  OHMR Military Indoctrination Award
  OHMR Emergency Service Training Award
  OHMR Volunteer Service Award
  OHMR Military Award Readiness
  OHMR Recruiting Achievement Award
  OHMR Military Proficiency Award
  State Guard Association of the United States Membership Ribbon
  State Guard Association of Ohio Member Ribbon

Ohio Military Reserve (OHMR) Unit Awards:
  OHMR Outstanding Unit Citation Award
  OHMR Commanding General's Meritorious Unit Service Award

South Carolina

South Carolina State Guard (SCSG) Awards:

  South Carolina Medal of Valor
  SCSG Distinguished Service Medal
  SCSG Medal of Merit
  SCSG Meritorious Service Medal
  SCSG Commendation Medal
  SCSG Home Defense Achievement Ribbon (not currently listed as an authorized award in SCSGR 672-1)
  SCSG Individual Achievement Ribbon
  SCSG Good Conduct Ribbon
  SCSG Longevity Service Medal
  SCSG Golden Anniversary Ribbon
  SCSG Federal Service School Ribbon
  SCSG Humanitarian Service Ribbon
  SCSG Service Ribbon
  SCSG Emergency Service Training Ribbon
  SCSG Volunteer Service Ribbon
  SCSG Honors Detail Service Ribbon
  SCSG Military Readiness Ribbon
  SCSG Recruiting Achievement Ribbon
  SCSG Military Proficiency Ribbon
  South Carolina Governor's Unit Citation
  SCSG Outstanding Unit Citation
  SCSG Unit Achievement Award

Tennessee

Tennessee State Guard (TNSG) Individual Awards:

  TNSG Valor Ribbon
  TNSG Alvin C. York Ribbon
  TNSG Distinguished Service Ribbon
  TNSG Meritorious Service Ribbon
  TNSG Com. Gen. Letter of Commendation Ribbon
  TNSG Commendation Ribbon
  TNSG Wound Ribbon
  TNSG Life Saving Ribbon
  TNSG Officer Achievement Ribbon
  TNSG Enlisted Achievement Ribbon
  TNSG TN Defense Service Ribbon
  TNSG Search & Rescue Ribbon
  TNSG Aid to Civil Authority Ribbon
  TNSG Operation Desert Storm/Shield Ribbon
  TNSG Operation Enduring Freedom Ribbon
  TNSG Operation Task Force Volunteer Ribbon
  TNSG Community Volunteer Service Ribbon
  TNSG Soldier of the Year Ribbon
  TNSG Good Conduct Ribbon
  TNSG Officer Training
  TNSG NCO Training Ribbon
  TNSG Basic Entry Level Training
  TNSG Chaplain's Ribbon
  TNSG Volunteer Service Ribbon
  TNSG Recruitment Achievement Ribbon
  TNSG Recruiter's Ribbon
  TNSG Military Readiness Ribbon
  TNSG Service Ribbon

Texas

Texas National Guard Awards  (Awardable to Texas State Guard members:)

  Texas Legislative Medal of Honor
  Texas Medal of Valor
  Texas Purple Heart Medal
  Texas Superior Service Medal
  Texas Lone Star Distinguished Service Medal
  Texas Outstanding Service Medal
  Texas Medal of Merit (also awarded with "V" for valor)
  Texas Cold War Victory Medal
  Texas Adjutant General's Individual Award
  Texas Humanitarian Service Ribbon
   Texas Homeland Defense Service Medal
  Texas Faithful Service Medal

Texas State Guard (TXSG) Awards:
  Texas State Guard Meritorious Service Ribbon
  Texas State Guard Commanding General's Individual Award Ribbon
  Texas State Guard Recruiting Ribbon
  Texas State Guard Officer Professional Development Ribbon
  Texas State Guard NCO Professional Development Ribbon
  Texas State Guard Enlisted Personnel Basic Training Ribbon
  Texas State Guard Physical Fitness Ribbon
  Texas State Guard Service Medal

Texas State Guard Unit Awards:
  Texas Governor's Unit Citation
  Texas State Guard Meritorious Unit Award
  Texas State Guard Organizational Excellence Award

Vermont
Vermont State Guard awards:
  Vermont Military Humanitarian Service Medal

Virginia
The Virginia Defense Force awards, or has previously awarded, the following awards and decorations:
   Life Saving Medal (LSM)
   Distinguished Service Ribbon (DSM)
  Meritorious Service Medal (MSM)
   Commendation Medal (CM)
   Military Commendation Certificate Ribbon (MCR)
  Active Service Ribbon (ASR)
   VDF Service Medal (VDFSR/VSR)
  Community Service Ribbon (CSR)
  Service Ribbon (SR)
   Response Management Staff College Completion Ribbon (obsolete)
  Operational Staff, Command, Control & Communications Course Ribbon (OSC3R) (obsolete)
  Advanced Leader Course Ribbon (ALCR) (obsolete)
  Company Leader Course Ribbon (CLCR) (obsolete)
  Noncommissioned Officer Development Ribbon (NCODR)
  Recruiting and Retention Ribbon (RRR)
  State Guard Association of the United States Longevity Ribbon (SGAUSR)
  State Guard Association of the United States Membership Ribbon (SGAUSLR)
  VDF Unit Readiness Citation (Dead Eye)

Washington
The Washington State Guard awards, or has previously awarded, the following awards and decorations:
  Washington Distinguished Service Medal
  Washington Legion of Merit Medal
  Washington Cross of Valor
  Washington Meritorious Service Medal
  Washington Commendation Medal
  Washington Achievement Medal
 Washington Strength Management Ribbon
  Washington Emergency Service Ribbon
  Washington National Guard Service Ribbon
  Washington Unit Citation

State Guard Association of the United States
The State Guard Association of the United States awards, or has previously awarded, the following awards and decorations:
  SGAUS Presidential Service Medal
  SGAUS Distinguished Service Medal 
  SGAUS Medal of Merit 
  SGAUS Meritorious Service Award 
  SGAUS Commendation Medal 
  SGAUS Achievement Medal 
  SGAUS Faithful Service Medal 
  SGAUS Recruiting Achievement Medal 
  SGAUS Longevity Medal 
  SGAUS Military Justice Award 
  SGAUS Professional Development Award
  SGAUS Membership Medal
SGAUS Unit awards:
  SGAUS Superior Unit Citation
  SGAUS Meritorious Superior Unit Citation

References 

State awards and decorations of the United States